Sands of time may refer to:

Sands of time (idiom), a figurative expression in the English language relating the passage of time to the sand in an hourglass.

Music albums
Sands of Time (Jay and the Americans album), a 1969 album by Jay and the Americans
Sands of Time (S.O.S. Band album), a 1986 R&B album by the S.O.S. Band
Sands of Time (EP), the 2002 debut EP by Black Majesty
Sands of Time (Black Majesty album), a 2003 power metal album by Black Majesty
Sands of Time, a 2003 hardcore album by Born from Pain
Sands of Time (Clive Palmer album), a 2004 album by Clive Palmer
Sands of Time (Nothing's Carved in Stone album), a 2010 rock album by Nothing's Carved in Stone

Songs and music
"Sands of Time", a song from Fleetwood Mac's 1971 album Future Games
"Sands of Time", a 1972 song by Vodka Collins
"Sands of Time", a song from Edguy's 2000 album The Savage Poetry
"Sands of Time", a song from Wayne Hancock's 2001 album, A-Town Blues
 "The Sands of Time", a song by LeAnn Rimes on her 2001 album God Bless America
"Sands of Time", a song from Judas Priest's 2008 album Nostradamus
"Sands of Time", theme song of professional wrestler Jinder Mahal
Sands of Time (opera), an opera by composer Peter Reynolds that debuted in 1993

Novels
 The Sands of Time (Sheldon novel), a 1988 novel by Sidney Sheldon
 The Sands of Time (Richards novel), a 1996 Doctor Who novel by Justin Richards
 The Sands of Time (Hoeye novel), a 2002 children's novel by Michael Hoeye

Television
 "The Sands of Time" (Xiaolin Showdown), episode 208 of the Xiaolin Showdown television series
 The Sands of Time, a 1992 television film directed by Gary Nelson

Others
 Prince of Persia: The Sands of Time, a 2003 video game, first in the "Sands of Time" series
 Prince of Persia: The Sands of Time (film), a 2010 film based on the 2003 video game